The 13th Trampoline World Championships were held in Osaka, Japan from August 24 to August 26, 1984.

Results

Men

Trampoline Individual

Trampoline Team

Trampoline Synchro

Double Mini Trampoline

Double Mini Trampoline Team

Tumbling

Tumbling Team

Women

Trampoline Individual

Trampoline Team

Trampoline Synchro

Double Mini Trampoline

Double Mini Trampoline Team

Tumbling

Tumbling Team

References
 Trampoline UK

1984 in Japanese sport
Trampoline World Championships
Trampoline Gymnastics World Championships
International gymnastics competitions hosted by Japan